Haim Katz (born 21 December 1947) is an Israeli politician. He currently serves as the Minister of Tourism. Katz was the Minister of Labor, Welfare and Social Services from 2015 to 2019, and served as a member of the Knesset for One Nation between 1999 and 2003, and for Likud between 2003 and 2023.

Biography
Born in Germany in 1947, Katz immigrated to Israel in 1949. After finishing school and national service he worked as an electronics technician. He became involved with trade unions when he became a member of the workers' council at Israel Aerospace Industries in 1983, and was also chairman of the technicians and engineers' union. In 1993 he became secretary of the National Workers Union of Israel Aircraft Industries, and was appointed chairman of the pension funds policy team of the Histadrut in 1996. Katz founded the Oz (lit. Strength) faction within the Histadrut.

In 1999 Katz joined the new One Nation party. He was placed second on its list for the elections that year, and was elected to the Knesset when the party won two seats.

Shortly before the 2003 election, he defected to Likud and was placed 37th on its list. He was re-elected as the party won 38 seats. As a Likud MK he was appointed Chairman of the Labour, Welfare and Health Committee. He also initiated a bill banning MKs from serving as head of the Histadrut, meaning Peretz had to resign from his post in the union.

In the Likud primaries for the 2006 election, Katz gained thirteenth place on the party's list. Likud won only twelve seats and he lost his seat. However, when Natan Sharansky resigned from the Knesset in November 2006, Katz replaced him as the next member on the list. He retained his seat in the 2009 elections, for which he was placed fourteenth on the Likud list. He was re-elected again in 2013 and 2015, after which he was appointed Minister of Welfare and Social Services in the 2015 Netanyahu government. On 15 December 2019 Katz announced that he would support Gideon Sa'ar in the Likud leadership election.

On 9 November 2021, An indictment was filed against Katz by Attorney General Avichai Mandelblit, after Katz waived his parliamentary immunity and agreed to a plea deal. In December 2021 Katz admitted and was charged with the charges of a conflict of interest and conspiracy to achieve a lawful purpose by improper means. He is expected to be sentenced with suspended sentence and financial penalties.

Katz was appointed Minister of Tourism on 29 December 2022. He resigned from the Knesset on 6 January 2023 as part of the Norwegian Law.

Katz lives in Shoham and is married with three children. He is also a member of the Israel Football Association.

References

External links

1947 births
Living people
20th-century German Jews
One Nation (Israel) politicians
Likud politicians
German emigrants to Israel
People from Givatayim
Jewish Israeli politicians
Members of the 15th Knesset (1999–2003)
Members of the 16th Knesset (2003–2006)
Members of the 17th Knesset (2006–2009)
Members of the 18th Knesset (2009–2013)
Members of the 19th Knesset (2013–2015)
Members of the 20th Knesset (2015–2019)
Members of the 21st Knesset (2019)
Members of the 22nd Knesset (2019–2020)
Members of the 23rd Knesset (2020–2021)
Members of the 24th Knesset (2021–2022)
Members of the 25th Knesset (2022–)
Ministers of Labour of Israel
Ministers of Tourism of Israel